George Marshall (1863 – 1 July 1907) was a New Zealand cricketer. He played in seventeen first-class matches for Canterbury and Hawke's Bay from 1888 to 1902.

References

External links
 

1863 births
1907 deaths
New Zealand cricketers
Canterbury cricketers
Hawke's Bay cricketers